Vicente María Camacho y Moya (June 8, 1886 − February 18, 1943) was a Mexican Roman Catholic bishop.

Ordained to the priesthood on December 5, 1909, Camacho y Moya was named bishop of the Roman Catholic Diocese of Tabasco, Mexico in 1930 and died in 1943 while still in office.

References 

1886 births
1943 deaths
People from Guadalajara, Jalisco
Roman Catholic bishops of Tabasco
20th-century Roman Catholic bishops in Mexico